In combinatorics, a k-ary necklace of length n is an equivalence class of n-character strings over an alphabet of size k, taking all rotations as equivalent. It represents a structure with n circularly connected beads which have k available colors. 

A k-ary bracelet, also referred to as a turnover (or free) necklace, is a necklace such that strings may also be equivalent under reflection. That is, given two strings, if each is the reverse of the other, they belong to the same equivalence class. For this reason, a necklace might also be called a fixed necklace to distinguish it from a turnover necklace.

Formally, one may represent a necklace as an orbit of the cyclic group acting on n-character strings over an alphabet of size k, and a bracelet as an orbit of the dihedral group. One can count these orbits, and thus necklaces and bracelets, using Pólya's enumeration theorem.

Equivalence classes

Number of necklaces 

There are

different k-ary necklaces of length n, where  is Euler's totient function. This follows directly from Pólya's enumeration theorem applied to the action of the cyclic group  acting on the set of all functions .
There are also 
 	
 
 	
different necklaces of length n with exactly k different colored beads, where  are the Stirling number of the second kind. (The variable k is overloaded and it is unclear whether k refers to the alphabet size or to the number of distinct elements in the necklace.) 
 	
 
 
	
and

Number of bracelets 
There are a total of

different k-ary bracelets of length n, where Nk(n) is the number of k-ary necklaces of length n.  This follows from Pólya's method applied to the action of the dihedral group .

Case of distinct beads 

For a given set of n beads, all distinct, the number of distinct necklaces made from these beads, counting rotated necklaces as the same, is  = (n − 1)!. This is because the beads can be linearly ordered in n! ways, and the n circular shifts of such an ordering all give the same necklace.

If the beads are not all distinct, having repeated colors, then there are fewer necklaces (and bracelets). The above necklace-counting polynomials give the number necklaces made from all possible multisets of beads. Polya's pattern inventory polynomial refines the counting polynomial, using variable for each bead color, so that the coefficient of each monomial counts the number of necklaces on a given multiset of beads.

Aperiodic necklaces 
An aperiodic necklace of length n is a rotation equivalence class having size n, i.e., no two distinct rotations of a necklace from such class are equal. 

According to Moreau's necklace-counting function, there are

different k-ary aperiodic necklaces of length n, where μ is the Möbius function. The two necklace-counting functions are related by:  where the sum is over all divisors of n, which is equivalent by Möbius inversion to  

Each aperiodic necklace contains a single Lyndon word so that Lyndon words form representatives of aperiodic necklaces.

See also 
 Lyndon word
 Inversion (discrete mathematics)
 Necklace problem
 Necklace splitting problem
 Permutation
 Proofs of Fermat's little theorem#Proof by counting necklaces
 Forte number, a representation of binary bracelets of length 12 used in atonal music.

References

External links 

 
 
 

Combinatorics on words
Enumerative combinatorics